West of Abilene is a 1940 American Western film directed by Ralph Ceder and written by Paul Franklin. The film stars Charles Starrett, Marjorie Cooley, Bruce Bennett, William Pawley, Don Beddoe and George Cleveland. The film was released on October 21, 1940, by Columbia Pictures.

Plot

Cast          
Charles Starrett as Tom Garfield
Marjorie Cooley as Judith Burnside
Bruce Bennett as Frank Garfield
William Pawley as Chris Matson
Don Beddoe as Forsyth
George Cleveland as Bill Burnside
Forrest Taylor as Sheriff
William Kellogg as Deputy 
Bob Nolan as Bob
Francis Walker as Bat
Eddie Laughton as Poke
Vester Pegg as Kennedy
Bud Osborne as Wilson

References

External links
 

1940 films
American Western (genre) films
1940 Western (genre) films
Columbia Pictures films
Films directed by Ralph Ceder
American black-and-white films
1940s English-language films
1940s American films